This is the list of notable stars in the constellation Corvus, sorted by decreasing brightness.

See also
List of stars by constellation

References

List
Corvus